Richard Anthony Greenough (born 30 May 1961) is an English former professional footballer who played as a central defender in the Football League for Chester City and York City.

References

1961 births
Living people
People from Mexborough
Footballers from Doncaster
Association football central defenders
English footballers
Alfreton Town F.C. players
Chester City F.C. players
Scarborough F.C. players
York City F.C. players
Bridlington Town A.F.C. players
English Football League players